"Crossover" is a single by American hip hop group EPMD released in August 1992 from their album Business Never Personal. The song's lyrics criticize rappers who crossover to R&B or pop in order to sell more. The single became EPMD's highest charting as it climbed the Billboard charts at #42. The song was also certified gold by RIAA, becoming the group's only single to accomplish that feat. The song samples "Don't Worry If There's a Hell Below (We're All Gonna Go)" by Curtis Mayfield and Roger Troutman's "You Should Be Mine". A music video, colored in blue, was released for the song which features Erick Sermon and Parrish Smith rapping around a building under construction with other people around doing various activities like break-dancing.

Track listing
Crossover – 3:50
Crossover (Instrumental) – 3:49
Crossover (Trunk Mix) – 4:15
Crossover (Trunk Mix Instrumental) – 4:15
Brothers From Brentwood L.I. – 3:30

Charts

Certifications

References

1992 songs
EPMD songs
Songs written by Erick Sermon
Songs written by PMD (rapper)
Def Jam Recordings singles